Shota Ishimine (伊志嶺 翔大, born May 12, 1988) is a professional baseball outfielder for the Chiba Lotte Marines of the Pacific League in Nippon Professional Baseball.

Ishimine attended Tokai University. He competed for the Japanese national baseball team in the 2010 World University Baseball Championship, being named an All-Tournament outfielder, along with Mikie Mahtook and Yoenis Céspedes.

References

External links

1988 births
Living people
Baseball people from Okinawa Prefecture
Tokai University alumni
Japanese baseball players
Nippon Professional Baseball outfielders
Chiba Lotte Marines players
Japanese baseball coaches
Nippon Professional Baseball coaches